Human Target is a 1974 Australian film about a special agent investigating the opium trade.

It was one of three TV movies that Channel Nine made, with a budget of a million dollars all up. The others were Spiral Bureau and Paradise.

Cast
 Alfred Bell
 Pat Bishop
 Liz Crossan
 Enid Lorimer
 Edmund Pizzi
 Peter Summer
 Jack Thompson

References

External links

Human Target at AustLit

Australian television films
1974 films
1970s English-language films
Films directed by Howard Rubie
1970s Australian films